Brigadier Richard Evelyn Simpkin MC (1921–1986) was a British Army officer.

Simpkin was commissioned into the Royal Tank Regiment in 1941. He cut short a degree course at the University of Cambridge to do so. He served in North Africa where he won the Military Cross and was taken prisoner.  Simpkin was awarded an Order of the British Empire (OBE) for his part in the new design of the Chieftain tank and retired from the army in 1971. He continued to write, lecture and consult about armour doctrine, tactics and Soviet thinking, living at first in Norfolk, England where he was brought up and then in Elgin, Scotland.

Bibliography (incomplete)
Antitank: An Airmechanized Response to Armored Threats in the 90s. Oxford: Brassey's, 1982. .
(In association with John Erickson), Deep Battle: The Brainchild of Marshal Tukhachevskii. London: Brassey's Defence, 1987.  .
Broadmanship: A Guide to Safe Boating on the Norfolk Broads. Cartoons by Nicholas Walmsley, illustrations by Chas Emerson. London: Barrie and Jenkins, Bayard Books, 1976.  .
The Cruising Yachtsman's Navigator. Illustrated by John Bradley. London: S. Paul, 1978.  , .
Human Factors in Mechanized Warfare. Oxford: Brassey's Publishers, 1983. .
Race to the Swift: Thoughts on Twenty-first Century Warfare. Foreword by Donn A. Starry. London: Brassey's Defence, 1985.  .
Red Armour: An Examination of the Soviet Mobile Force Concept. Oxford: Brassey's Defence, 1984.  .
Seamanship for the Cruising Yachtsman. London: Paul, 1979.  .
Tank Warfare: An Analysis of Soviet and NATO Tank Philosophy. With a foreword by Robert W. Komer and an introduction by F. M. von Senger und Etterlin. London: Brassey's Publishers, 1979. , .

1921 births
1986 deaths
British Army personnel of World War II
Simpkin, Richard
Simpkin, Richard
Simpkin, Richard
British World War II prisoners of war
Military theorists
British Army brigadiers